The 1955–56 season was Stoke City's 49th season in the Football League and the 16th in the Second Division.

It was a season of what might have been for Stoke as they often looked capable of challenging for promotion but then played badly the next match. In the end Stoke had to settle for a final position of 13th after picking up a modest 44 points in what was a frustrating season.

Season review

League
Manager Frank Taylor now backed by his namesake Mr G. Taylor made only minor adjustments to his squad for the start of the 1955–56 season. However, after a decent start to the season with Stoke looking capable of challenging for promotion the Stoke board showed their ambition. In November Stoke made an ambitious approach for Blackpool legend Stan Mortensen and it seemed that Stoke had signed a forward with some reasonable credentials, however much to the disappointment of the board Mortensen instead joined Hull City. So Stoke instead went and paid £11,000 to Lincoln City for their prolific forward Andy Graver. However, despite the new arrival being met by approval by the fans Graver would have an unsuccessful spell at the Victoria Ground.

It was a season of what might have been as Stoke failed to impress after their good start, and slid down the table finally ending up in a rather poor position of 13th. They were often found wanting and their home form was very poor, a 3–2 win against Liverpool was the best of the season in what was a 'thrilling' contest.

FA Cup
Stoke beat Exeter City (3–0) and Leicester City (2–1) both in replays before losing 2–1 at Newcastle United in the fifth round.

Final league table

Results

Stoke's score comes first

Legend

Football League Second Division

FA Cup

Squad statistics

References

Stoke City F.C. seasons
Stoke